Benham Park is a mansion (on the site of Benham Valence Manor) in the English ceremonial county of Berkshire and district of West Berkshire. The house is a Grade II* listed building and park is Grade II.

Architecture and history
The manor of Benham Valence was granted by Elizabeth I to Giovanni Battista Castiglione, her Italian tutor, in 1570. He is buried at St Mary's Church in Speen.

The current house was built in 1774-1775 by William Craven, 6th Baron Craven, and was designed by the architect Henry Holland. Benham Park was three storeys high, nine bays wide, in a plain neoclassical style, of stone, with a tetrastyle Ionic portico. The interiors have been altered. The Circular Hall in the centre of the building, with its large niches and fine plasterwork,  is probably as designed by Holland; it has an opening in the ceiling rising to the galleried floor above and a glazed dome. The principal staircase is also original.

The house was greatly altered in 1914; the portico at the rear of the house (facing the Great Lake) had its pediment removed and replaced by a stone balustrade. The roof was lowered in pitch and hidden behind a balustrade decorated at regular intervals. The servants quarters (on the top left hand side of the house behind the loggia) were also demolished due to poor structural condition.

The house is Grade II* listed, and one of its pairs of 17th-century ornate stone gate piers, removed from Hamstead Marshall,  is Grade I listed.  The park itself is at Grade II and has a lake with mill beside the house and aqueducts or artificial drains leading across marshy wetland to the River Kennet to the far south.

The house was built by Henry Holland and Capability Brown for William, 6th Baron Craven in 1775. It was later the home of his widow, Elizabeth Craven and her second husband, Charles Alexander, Margrave of Brandenburg-Ansbach.

In the late 19th and early 20th century, Benham Place was the family seat of the Sutton baronets.

The building was converted into offices in 1983 by the IT company Norsk Data, who used it as their headquarters for European operations (outside Norway), until the company's dissolution in 2003 with large parts being acquired by 2e2. Then it was home to 2e2, an ICT lifecycle services provider, until 2012 when it dissolved. Also within the grounds were two office buildings built in the 1980s and these housed other companies such as mobile data solution provider CognitoIQ, Exony and Idox, all of which have now moved to other premises as the phases comprising the office block were demolished.

References

External links

Country houses in Berkshire
West Berkshire District
Grade II* listed buildings in Berkshire
Grade I listed buildings in Berkshire
Norsk Data
Gardens by Capability Brown